The 1943–44 Fort Wayne Zollner Pistons season was the third season of the franchise in the National Basketball League. The Pistons entered the season with the big three of league MVP Bobby McDermott, Buddy Jeanette and Jake Pelkington and off of two straight losses in the championship series. The team finished the season 18–4 and defeated the Cleveland Chase Brassmen in the first round in a two-game sweep to earn their third straight finals birth and a rematch of last year against the Sheboygan Redskins. From there the Pistons swept the Redskins in 3 games to win their first NBL Championship.

Roster

League standings

Awards and honors
Robert McDermott was league leader is field goals made with 123. He was also the MVP of the season.
 Robert McDermott, First Team All-NBL
 Jake Pelkington, Second Team All-NBL

References

Fort Wayne Zollner Pistons seasons
Fort Wayne
National Basketball League (United States) championship seasons
Fort Wayne Zollner Pistons
Fort Wayne Zollner Pistons